This table displays the top-rated primetime television series of the 1956–57 season as measured by Nielsen Media Research.

References

1956 in American television
1957 in American television
1956-related lists
1957-related lists
Lists of American television series